Henry Jacques Le Même (17 October 1897 – 17 February 1997) was a French architect.

He designed a second chalet at Domaine du Mont d'Arbois for Noémie de Rothschild in the 1920s.

References

1897 births
1997 deaths
20th-century French architects
People from Haute-Savoie
Architects from Nantes